Chandpole is a locality in the Udaipur city of Rajasthan state.

General
Udaipur was one time surrounded by the City Wall of Udaipur, called in Hindi Parkota. One entry gate among seven is Chandpole Darvaja, the others being Hathipole, Udiapole, Surajpole, DelhiGate, and so on. It has now a large market in the city.

See also
Udaipur
Surajpole
Udiapole

References

Areas of Udaipur